Tabebuia shaferi is a species of plant in the family Bignoniaceae. It is endemic to Cuba.  It is threatened by habitat loss.

References

Flora of Cuba
shaferi
Vulnerable plants
Taxonomy articles created by Polbot